2-hydroxyglutarage dehydrogenase may refer to:
 L-2-hydroxyglutarate dehydrogenase, an enzyme specific to L-2-hydroxyglutarate (EC 1.1.99.2)
 D-2-hydroxyglutarate dehydrogenase, an enzyme specific to D-2-hydroxyglutarate (EC 1.1.99.39)